Michael Savea Ala'alatoa (born 28 August 1991) is a rugby union professional player who currently plays as a prop for Leinster in the united rugby championship and Heineken Champions Cup competitions.

Early life

Born into a rugby household where father Vili was a member of the  squad for the 1991 Rugby World Cup, Alaalatoa was quickly introduced into the sporting world and played rugby, volleyball and cricket in his childhood.

Club career
Rugby was where he excelled and he played three years in the Newington College First XV. He made his way through the ranks in the New South Wales Shute Shield, initially with Southern Districts and later West Harbour.   Some impressive performances at that level saw him become a regular member of the Waratahs wider training squad in 2014.

An injury to regular front-rower Paddy Ryan saw Alaalatoa called up to the Waratahs first team for the final round of league matches in the 2014 Super Rugby season.

Leading up to the 2015 ITM Cup Alaalatoa moved to New Zealand and signed to play for  where he had a solid season that earned him a 2016 super rugby contract with the 

It was announced on 12 April 2021 that Alaalatoa would be moving to Leinster to play Pro 14 and European Cup rugby starting in the 2021/22 season.

International career

Alaalatoa was a member of the Samoa Under 20 side that competed in the 2011 IRB Junior World Championship.

Alaalatoa was eligible to play international rugby for Samoa, Australia through birth and New Zealand through residency.

On 23 August 2019, he was named in Samoa's 34-man training squad for the 2019 Rugby World Cup, before being named in the final 31 on 31 August.

References

External links

1991 births
Living people
People educated at Newington College
Australian rugby union players
Rugby union props
Sportsmen from New South Wales
New South Wales Waratahs players
New South Wales Country Eagles players
Australian sportspeople of Samoan descent
Rugby union players from Sydney
Manawatu rugby union players
Crusaders (rugby union) players
Samoa international rugby union players
Moana Pasifika players
Leinster Rugby players